is a quasi-national park on the Oga Peninsula, in Akita Prefecture, in far northwestern Japan. The park is wholly within the city of Oga.
It is rated a protected landscape (Category V) according to the IUCN.

The area was designated a quasi-national park on May 15, 1973.

Like all quasi-national parks in Japan, the park is managed by the local prefectural government; in this case, that of Akita prefecture.

Godzilla Rock (Oga)

On the southern part of the Oga Peninsula, there is a craggy place called Cape Shiosezaki. One of the rocks there is nicknamed Godzilla Rock for its silhouette resembling Godzilla. When the sun goes down behind this natural formation, it creates the image of a flame-blowing monster. April and October are the best months for taking photos of the monster breathing fire. The other eroded and named rocks are Godzilla's Tail Rock, Gamera Rock, Turtle Rock, Twin Rocks and Sailboat Rock.

Gallery

See also
Oga Aquarium Gao
Nyūdōzaki Lighthouse
List of national parks of Japan

References

Sutherland, Mary and Britton, Dorothy. The National Parks of Japan. Kodansha International (1995).

External links

National parks of Japan
Oga, Akita
Parks and gardens in Akita Prefecture
Protected areas established in 1973
Rock formations of Japan
1973 establishments in Japan